Yalanchi (also Romanized as Yālānchī; also known as Shīrīn Darreh and Yātānchī) is a village in Atrak Rural District, Maneh District, Maneh and Samalqan County, North Khorasan Province, Iran. At the 2006 census, its population was 212, in 57 families.

References 

Populated places in Maneh and Samalqan County